Owen County Courthouse may refer to:

 Owen County Courthouse (Indiana), Spencer, Indiana
 Owen County Courthouse and Jail, Owenton, Kentucky